was a town located in Ayauta District, Kagawa Prefecture, Japan.

As of 2003, the town had an estimated population of 11,414 and a density of 420.41 persons per km². The total area was 27.15 km².

On March 22, 2005, Ayauta, along with the town of Hanzan (also from Ayauta District), was merged into the expanded city of Marugame and no longer exists as an independent municipality.

External links
 Official website of Marugame 

Dissolved municipalities of Kagawa Prefecture
Marugame, Kagawa